The 2014–15 Federation of Bosnia and Herzegovina Cup was the qualifying competition for the 2014–15 Bosnia and Herzegovina Football Cup.

Competition format
The competition was played in two stages, the preliminary stage and the final stage. Through the whole previous football season, each of ten cantons in the Federation of Bosnia and Herzegovina had its own cup competition with winners advancing to the Federation Cup Preliminary stage. Teams from the Second League of the Federation of Bosnia and Herzegovina (third level) and the lower leagues took part in the canton cups while teams from the First League of the Federation of Bosnia and Herzegovina did not enter the canton cups, but relegated teams from the 2013–14 First League of FBiH season had the opportunity to qualify to the Federation cup in a playoff against the best team from their respective canton cup. The Playoff had to be completed before 1 August 2014.

The preliminary stage was divided into two groups of five teams each and consisted of two rounds, the First preliminary round and the Second preliminary round. In the First preliminary round four teams in each group were drawn into two matches and the winners advanced to the next round along with one team given a bye to the next round. The Second preliminary round saw three teams in each group with two teams drawn into one match and one team given a bye to the Final stage - no team could have been given byes in both rounds. The byed team was joined by the winner of the Second preliminary round match.

Group North was consisted of the next cantons: Posavina, Tuzla, Zenica-Doboj, Sarajevo and Bosnian-Podrinje.

Group South was consisted of the next cantons: Herzegovina-Neretva, Canton 10, West Herzegovina, Una-Sana and Central Bosnia.

The final stage was consisted of 20 teams - four teams from the Preliminary stage and 16 teams from the First League of the Federation of Bosnia and Herzegovina. They were drawn into 10 matches with winners advancing to the 2014–15 Bosnia and Herzegovina Football Cup.

Canton cups

Una-Sana Canton
Statistics is shown in table below:

First round
Played on 18 September 2013

Second round
Played on 6 and 7 November 2013

Bajer 99 Velagići bye to next round
Omladinac Sanica and Bratstvo Bosanska Krupa forfeited

Third round
Played on 2 and 9 April 2014

Omladinac 75 Pokoj bye to next round
Jedinstvo Bihać and Podgrmeč Sanski Most will not play in next rounds as competition's format changed - only teams from Second league and lower can take part so they are removed from the Cup competition
Bajer 99 Velagići failed to show up to game

Semi final
Played on 16 April 2014

Final
Played on 8 June 2014; in Cazin (neutral ground)

Ključ qualified to the Federation Cup Preliminary Stage

Posavina Canton
Statistics is shown in table below:

First round
Played on 30 and 31 July 2014

Semi final
Played on 3 and 5 August 2014

Final
Played on 10 August 2014

Mladost Sibovac qualified to the Federation Cup Preliminary Stage

Tuzla Canton
Statistics is shown in table below:

First round
Played on 16 April 2014

Omladinac Mionica, Brčko 1978 and Čelić forfeited
Bosna Mionica failed to show up to game

Second round
Played on 7 and 21 May 2014

Konjuh Kladanj, 12. Decembar Rajska and Jedinstvo Vučkovci forfeited

Quarter final
Played on 11 and 14 June 2014

Semi final
Played on 17 June 2014

Final
Played on 13 August 2014; in Prokosovići (neutral ground)

Mramor qualified to the Federation Cup Preliminary Stage

Zenica-Doboj Canton
Statistics is shown in table below:

First round
Played on 7 and 8 May 2014

Borac Tetovo bye to next round
Napredak Šije and Vis Kosova forfeited

Second round
Played on 28 May 2014

Usora bye to next round
Stupčanica Olovo, Rudar Breza, Natron Maglaj and Nemila forfeited

Third round
Played on 7 June 2014

Žepče bye to next round
Borac Tetovo forfeited

Semi final
Played on 14 June 2014

Final
Played on 10 and 13 August 2014; over two legs

Žepče qualified to the Federation Cup Preliminary Stage

Bosnian-Podrinje Canton
Statistics is shown in table below:

Final
Played on 7 June 2014

Azot Vitkovići qualified to the Federation Cup Preliminary Stage
Goražde also qualified as they got promoted to the First League

Central Bosnia Canton
Statistics is shown in table below:

First round
Played on 28 May 2014

Radnik Donji Vakuf bye to next round
Rudar Han Bila disqualified after failing to meet minimum criteria to organize the match
Bilalovac CPU, both Kreševo and Kiseljak, Rijeka and Rudar Han Bila forfeited
1game interrupted, Elektrobosna Jajce disqualified

Second round
Played on 4 June 2014

Karaula and Fojnica forfeited

Third round
Played on 8 June 2014

Kaćuni and Dnoluka forfeited

Final
Played on 21 June 2014; in Travnik (neutral ground)

Novi Travnik qualified to the Federation Cup Preliminary Stage

Herzegovina-Neretva Canton
Competition is split in two stages. First stage consists of teams from canton league (fourth level) with winner qualifying to the Second stage. In Second stage First stage winner is joined by teams from the Second League with winner advancing to the Federation of BiH Cup.

Statistics is shown in table below:

First stage – First round
Played on 6 May 2014

Međugorje forfeited

First stage – Semi final
Played on 21 and 22 May

First stage – Final
Played on 4 June 2014; in Čitluk (neutral ground)

Both teams qualified to Second stage

Second stage – Quarter final
Played on 19 and 20 July 2014

Second stage – Semi final
Played on 26 and 27 July 2014

Second stage – Final
Played on 2 August 2014; in Cim (neutral ground)

Turbina Jablanica qualified to the Federation Cup Preliminary Stage, but as they qualified via league too, Višići also qualified and will play in Preliminary stage

West Herzegovina Canton
Statistics is shown in table below:

Final
Played on 13 August 2014

Sloga Ljubuški qualified to the Federation Cup Preliminary Stage

Sarajevo Canton
Statistics is shown in table below:

First round
Played on 6 and 7 May 2014

Final
Played on 8 June 2014; in Vogošća (neutral ground)

Mladost Župča qualified to the Federation Cup Preliminary Stage

Canton 10
Statistics is shown in table below:

First round
Played on 1 June 2014

Šujica forfeited

Second round
Played on 8 June 2014

Third round
Played on 23 July 2014

Kupres and both Bužan and Troglav forfeited

Final
Played on 29 July 2014

Tomislav Tomislavgrad qualified to the Federation Cup Preliminary Stage

Combined statistics

Federation of Bosnia and Herzegovina Cup
Statistics is shown in table below:

Preliminary stage - Group North
Qualified teams:

First preliminary round
Played on 20 August 2014

Mladost Župča bye to next round

Second preliminary round
Played on 27 August 2014

Mladost Sibovac bye to Final stage

Preliminary stage - Group South
Qualified teams:

First preliminary round
Played on 20 August 2014

Ključ bye to next round
1game interrupted in 65th minute after home fan assaulted an away player; Sloga was assigned 3–0 win

Second preliminary round
Played on 27 August 2014

Sloga Ljubuški bye to Final stage

Final stage
Qualified teams (teams from 2014-2015 First League season and four Preliminary stage teams):

1teams played in canton cups also as they were lower league members at the time
2automatic qualification to this round

Played on 3 September 2014

External links
Official site for the Football Federation of the Federation of Bosnia and Herzegovina

Cup